Arthur Annesley, 10th Viscount Valentia (30 November 1785 – 30 December 1863) was an English-born land-owner, an Irish peer and the Premier Baronet of Ireland.

Family

Arthur Annesley was born on 30 November 1785, the eldest son of Arthur Annesley, MP for Oxford between 1790 and 1796, and his wife, Catherine Hardy, a daughter of Admiral Sir Charles Hardy. He was a male-line, paternal descendant of the first Viscount Valentia.

He married, on 12 August 1808, Eleanor O'Brien, the daughter of Henry O'Brien (later Stafford-O'Brien) of Blatherwycke park, Northamptonshire and his wife Margaret Flenary. Together, they had thirteen children, four sons and nine daughters:

 Arthur Annesley (1809–1844). He married, in 1836, Flora-Mary Macdonald, daughter of Lieutenant-Colonel James Macdonald, and had issue, two daughters and one son:
 Mary Annesley (1836–1879), who married, on 24 February 1855, Captain Walter Chidiock Nangle, and had issue.
 Flora Annesley (born 1841), who married, on 23 June 1863, Colonel Francis Lyon, and had issue.
 Lieutenant Arthur Annesley, eleventh Viscount Annesley  (1843–1927), who inherited the title from his grandfather, and who served as High Sheriff of Oxfordshire in 1874, as MP for Oxford from 1895 to 1917, and Comptroller of the Household from 1898 to 1905.
 Temple Arthur Francis Annesley (1813–1838).
 Charles Arthur James George Annesley (born 1820).
 Captain Algernon Sydney Arthur Annesley (born 1829), was an officer in the Oxfordshire Militia, and married, on 11 October 1864, Helen Sydney Richards, a daughter of Griffiths Richards ., and had issue
 Ellen Arthur Frances Annesley (died 1811), a twin with her sister,
 Catherine Arthur Letitia Annesley (died 1811).
 Elearnor Arthur Catherine Annesley.
 Frances Arthur Charlotte Annesley, who married, on 17 October 1853, Captain William Linskill of Tynemouth Lodge, Northumberland, and had issue.
 Matilda Arthur Marina Annesley, who married, on 10 July 1845, John Kent Egerton Holmes, and had issue.
 Eva Arthur Henry Medora Annesley, who married, on 12 January 1853, Sir Henry Robinson, first Baronet,, sometime Vice-President of the Local Government Board of Ireland, and had issue., great-grandchildren included stained glass artist Evie Hone.
 Nea Arthur Ada Rose d'Amour Annesley, who married, on 24 April 1846, Hercules George Robert Robinson, first Baron Rosmead, a Governor of Hong Kong, and had issue.
 Augusta Arthur Constantia Annesley.
 Altisidora Arthur Victoria Annesley.

Titles

On the death of the ninth Viscount Valentia, who had no immediate relatives, Annesley, being a very distant cousin, assumed the peerage, which had been created in 1642, without attempting to establish this right in the House of Lords. Cokayne points out that he was "probably correct" in assuming the peerage. He also assumed the title of Baron Mountnorris, another Irish peerage, which was also held by the ninth Viscount, and was the Premier Baronet of Ireland, inheriting also the Annesley Baronetcy, of Newport Pagnell.

Ancestry

Later life

Lord Valentia died on 30 December 1863 at Bletchingdon park, aged 78. His wife had predeceased him, having died on 10 June 1843.

References

Citations

Bibliography

 Burke, J. (1834), vol. 1 
 Cokayne, G.E. (1898), The Complete Peerage of England, Scotland, Ireland, Great Britain and the United Kingdom, first edition, volume 8 (U to Z).
 Davies, J.D. (2004) "Hardy, Sir Charles, the younger (bap. 1717, d. 1780)", Oxford Dictionary of National Biography
 Gwyn, J. (1979). "Hardy, Sir Charles", Dictionary of Canadian Biography (volume iv).
 Lodge, E. (1861). The Peerage and Baronetage of the British Empire.
 Ruvigny (Marquess de) (1907). The Plantagenet Roll of the Blood Royal, "Exeter" volume

Viscounts in the Peerage of Ireland
1785 births
1863 deaths
Arthur